Erythranthe nudata, the bare monkeyflower, is a species of monkeyflower endemic to the serpentine soils of Colusa, Lake and Napa Counties in California. It is an annual flower with bright yellow tube-shaped blooms and small narrow leaves.

Taxonomy
Erythranthe nudata is a member of the Erythranthe guttata species complex, a group of closely related wildflower species that vary dramatically in mating system, life history and edaphic tolerance. Species in the E. guttata complex are largely inter-fertile, with some notable exceptions. In particular, E. nudata is reproductively isolated from other complex members via a postzygotic isolating barrier during seed development.

References

External links
Jepson Manual Treatment
USDA Plants Profile
Photo gallery
Consortium of California Herbaria

nudatus
Endemic flora of California
Natural history of the California chaparral and woodlands
Natural history of the California Coast Ranges
Natural history of Colusa County, California
Natural history of Lake County, California
Natural history of Napa County, California
Flora without expected TNC conservation status